HMCS Brantford was a  that served in the Royal Canadian Navy during the Second World War. She served primarily as a convoy escort in the Battle of the Atlantic. She was named for Brantford, Ontario.

Background

Flower-class corvettes like Brantford serving with the Royal Canadian Navy during the Second World War were different from earlier and more traditional sail-driven corvettes. The "corvette" designation was created by the French as a class of small warships; the Royal Navy borrowed the term for a period but discontinued its use in 1877. During the hurried preparations for war in the late 1930s, Winston Churchill reactivated the corvette class, needing a name for smaller ships used in an escort capacity, in this case based on a whaling ship design. The generic name "flower" was used to designate the class of these ships, which – in the Royal Navy – were named after flowering plants.

Corvettes commissioned by the Royal Canadian Navy during the Second World War were named after communities for the most part, to better represent the people who took part in building them. This idea was put forth by Admiral Percy W. Nelles. Sponsors were commonly associated with the community for which the ship was named. Royal Navy corvettes were designed as open sea escorts, while Canadian corvettes were developed for coastal auxiliary roles which was exemplified by their minesweeping gear. Eventually the Canadian corvettes would be modified to allow them to perform better on the open seas.

Construction
Brantford was ordered as part of the 1940–1941 Flower-class building program. She was identical to the 1939–1940 program except for a few changes. The 1940–41 program had water-tube boilers, which were less responsive but had more reliability in providing a consistent supply of steam. The second change was that no minesweeping gear was ever installed, as the role of the corvette had changed from coastal auxiliary to convoy escort.

Brantford was laid down 24 February 1941 by Midland Shipyards Ltd. at Midland, Ontario and launched 6 September 1941. She was commissioned 15 May 1942 at Montreal, Quebec. During her career, Brantford had two significant refits. The first took place at Quebec City from August to September 1943. The second took place at Sydney, Nova Scotia from August to September 1944. She was among the few Flower-class corvettes not to have her fo'c'sle extended.

War service
After working up, Brantford joined the Western Local Escort Force (WLEF) in July 1942. When WLEF reorganized into escort groups, Brantford was assigned to group W-3 initially. In April 1944 she joined W-2. In June 1944, Brantford was loaned to the Mid-Ocean Escort Force escort group C-3 for one round trip to the United Kingdom and back.

She remained in this capacity until the end of the war.

Post-war service
Brantford was paid off 17 August 1945 at Sorel, Quebec. She sailed to Halifax and was handed over to the War Assets Corporation who in turn, sold her to George E. Irving of New Brunswick. In 1956 she was sold again and renamed Otori Maru No.14. In 1961 she was renamed Kyo Maru No.21. In 1972 the ship was converted to a tugboat of 724 tons and was renamed Daito Maru No.71. She last appeared on Lloyd's Register in 1972–73. The ship was broken up in 1976.

References

External links
 City of Brantford webpage about HMCS Brantford

Ships of the Royal Canadian Navy
Flower-class corvettes of the Royal Canadian Navy
1941 ships